Necon Air Flight 128 (3Z 128/NEC 128) was a scheduled domestic flight from Pokhara Airport to Kathmandu Airport in Nepal on 5 September 1999. The Hawker Siddeley HS 748 crashed when it hit a telecommunications tower.

Aircraft 
The aircraft involved was a Series B Hawker Siddeley HS 748 built in 1988, bought from UNI Air in November 1997. At that time, the airline operated three other 748s.

Incident 
Flight 128 departed from Pokhara at 10:00 for a 35-minute domestic flight to Kathmandu. While approaching Tribhuvan Airport's runway 02 at 10:25 am local time, the aircraft hit a telecommunications tower, killing all five crew members and all ten passengers. It was Necon Air's second fatal accident in 1999.

Passengers and crew
Due to the hard impact into ground after the accident, none of the fifteen occupants survived the crash.

See also
 List of airplane accidents in Nepal

References 

Aviation accidents and incidents in 1999
Aviation accidents and incidents in Nepal
1999 in Nepal
Accidents and incidents involving the Hawker Siddeley HS 748
1999 disasters in Nepal